Chkhorotsqu (Mingrelian for "nine springs") is a townlet in western Georgia, located in the region of Samegrelo-Zemo Svaneti and functioning as the administrative center of the homonymous district. Its population was 3,141 as of 2014 (including over 1,500 IDPs from breakaway Abkhazia).

Notable residents 
 Gogita Gogua, footballer

See also
 Samegrelo-Zemo Svaneti

References

External links 
. Ministry of Culture, Monuments Protection and Sport of Georgia
Nature and culture of Chkhorotsku. Municipality of Chkhorotsku

Cities and towns in Samegrelo-Zemo Svaneti
Kutaisi Governorate